Worthland is an unincorporated community in New Castle County, Delaware, United States. Worthland is located northwest of U.S. Route 13 and northeast of Interstate 495 to the northeast of Claymont. It was originally developed by Worth Steel Corporation as a community for its workforce.

See also
Hickman Row
Union Park Gardens
Overlook Colony

References 

Unincorporated communities in New Castle County, Delaware
Unincorporated communities in Delaware